The 1979–80 Midland Football Combination season was the 43rd in the history of Midland Football Combination, a football competition in England.

Division One

Division One featured 17 clubs which competed in the division last season along with three new clubs:
Chipping Norton Town, joined from the Hellenic Football League
Cradley Town, promoted from Division Two
Studley Sporting, promoted from Division Two

League table

References

1979–80
8